The Coast Guard Medal is a decoration of the United States military that is awarded to any service member who, while serving in any capacity with the United States Coast Guard, distinguishes themselves by heroism not involving actual conflict with an enemy.  For the decoration to be awarded, an individual must have performed a voluntary act of heroism in the face of great personal danger or of such a magnitude that it stands out distinctly above normal expectations.

The first recipients of the Coast Guard Medal were FN Earl H. Leyda and BM3 Albert Raymond Johnson who were awarded the decoration in March 1958. The citation for the Coast Guard Medal was for actions performed in August 1957 while attempting to rescue trapped workers from the Oswego Water Works Tunnel, under Lake Ontario, in Oswego, New York.

Additional awards of the Coast Guard Medal are annotated by  inch gold stars.  The Coast Guard Medal is the equivalent to the Army's Soldier's Medal, the Navy and Marine Corps Medal, and the Air and Space Forces' Airman's Medal.

Notable recipients
Richard R. Callahan
Edgar Culbertson
Richard Dixon
William Flores
Michael P. Leavitt
David M. Lorange
Ronald C. Prei
Terrell E. Horne
Tristan Heaton
Jacob Poroo
Robert Earl Hill
Traci Huddleston
Tracy Mannes

See also
Awards and decorations of the United States military

References

Awards and decorations of the United States Coast Guard
Awards established in 1949
Courage awards